Vacuum bag may refer to:
Vacuum packing of vacuum-sealed bags
 Vacuum bag moulding
The dustbag of a Vacuum cleaner